Cocamide MEA, or cocamide monoethanolamine, is a solid, off-white to tan compound, often sold in flaked form. The solid melts to yield a pale yellow viscous clear liquid. It is a mixture of fatty acid amides which is produced from the fatty acids in coconut oil when reacted with ethanolamine.

Uses
Cocamide MEA and other cocamide ethanolamines such as cocamide DEA are used as foaming agents and nonionic surfactants in shampoos and bath products, and as emulsifying agents in cosmetics.

See also
 Cocamide

References

Non-ionic surfactants
Cosmetics chemicals
Fatty acid amides